Thomas Roger Marshall (1849–1913) was a Scottish international rugby and cricket player. He played at three quarter back.

Rugby career
He also played for Edinburgh Academicals. His brother William Marshall also gained a single cap for Scotland in 1872.

Cricket career
He also played for the Scotland national cricket team.

References
 Bath, Richard (ed.) The Scotland Rugby Miscellany (Vision Sports Publishing Ltd, 2007 )

1849 births
1913 deaths
Scottish rugby union players
Scotland international rugby union players
Scottish cricketers
History of rugby union in Scotland
Edinburgh Academicals rugby union players
Marylebone Cricket Club cricketers
Edinburgh District (rugby union) players
Rugby union players from Northumberland
Rugby union three-quarters